Llusca Ritti (possibly from Quechua llusk'a polished / slippery, rit'i snow, "polished snow" or "slippery snow") is a mountain in the Vilcanota mountain range in the Andes of Peru, about  high. It is located in the Puno Region, Carabaya Province, Corani District. Llusca Ritti lies southeast of the mountains Taruca Sayana and Quello Sallayoc, southwest of the mountain Riti Huasi and north of the mountain Yana Sallayoc.

Intermittent streams originates northeast and southeast of Llusca Ritti. Their waters flow to a lake named Quicho Suytococha and then to the river Lajamayu.

References

Mountains of Peru
Mountains of Puno Region